Road surface marking is any kind of device or material that is used on a road surface in order to convey official information; they are commonly placed with road marking machines (also referred to as road marking equipment or pavement marking equipment). They can also be applied in other facilities used by vehicles to mark parking spaces or designate areas for other uses. In some countries and areas (France, Italy, Czech Republic, Slovakia etc.), road markings are conceived as horizontal traffic signs, as opposed to vertical traffic signs placed on posts.

Road surface markings are used on paved roadways to provide guidance and information to drivers and pedestrians. Uniformity of the markings is an important factor in minimizing confusion and uncertainty about their meaning, and efforts exist to standardize such markings across borders. However, countries and areas categorize and specify road surface markings in different ways—white lines are called white lines mechanical, non-mechanical, or temporary. They can be used to delineate traffic lanes, inform motorists and pedestrians or serve as noise generators when run across a road, or attempt to wake a sleeping driver when installed in the shoulders of a road. Road surface marking can also indicate regulations for parking and stopping.

There is continuous effort to improve the road marking system, and technological breakthroughs include adding retroreflectivity, increasing longevity, and lowering installation cost.

Today, road markings are used to convey a range of information to the driver spanning navigational, safety and enforcement issues leading to their use in road environment understanding within advanced driver-assistance systems and consideration for future use in autonomous road vehicles.

Mechanical markers

Mechanical devices may be raised or recessed into the road surface, and either reflective or non-reflective. Most are permanent; some are movable.

 Cat's eye, invented by Percy Shaw in the 1930s, Cat's eyes equip many major routes in the British Isles. They consist of four reflective lenses mounted in a durable white rubber housing, two facing fore and two facing aft. The housing is mounted within a cast iron shoe, which the rubber housing sinks in to when driven over. This provides protection from snow plowing and allows the lenses to be self-cleaning—they pass a rubber blade when depressed. The lenses are available in a variety of different colors, mainly white, yellow/orange, green, red, and blue.
 Botts' dots (low rounded white or yellow dots), named for the California Caltrans engineer Elbert Botts, who invented the epoxy that keeps them glued down, are one type of a mechanical non-reflective raised marker. Generally they are used to mark the edges of traffic lanes, frequently in conjunction with raised reflective markers. Botts' dots are also used across a travel lane to draw the drivers attention to the road. They are frequently used in this way to alert drivers to toll booths, school zones or other significant reduction of speed limit. They are normally only used in warm climates since snow plows usually remove them along with the snow.
 Rumble strips are commonly used for the same purpose. Other alternatives, similar to the Botts' dots, use raised strips, painted or glued to the surface. A specific form of raised strips using thermoplastic is called profile thermoplastic markings. The markings are created by fusing thermoplastic to the pavement and create alternating elevation and recession pattern. This can be done as inverted-profile markings or raised-profile markings. Inverted-profile markings are created by pressing a cog rolling over the markings while they are wet to make them corrugated. Raised-profile markings are created by extruding extra thickness of thermoplastic at a specific interval to create bumps. Raised-profile markings are sometime known as convex traffic lines. Uses of rumble strips can be across the travel direction (to warn of hazards ahead) or along the travel direction (to warn of hazards of not staying within a specific lane). Their main way of function is creating a strong vibration when driven over that will alert a driver to various upcoming hazards both by sound and the physical vibration of the vehicle.
 Reflective markers are used as travel lane dividers, to mark the central reservation (median) or to mark exit slip-roads. Incorporating a raised retro-reflective element, they are typically more visible at night and in inclement weather than standard road marking lines. The colour of markers varies depending on the country of use; freeways in the United States often use reflectors manufactured to appear white to drivers proceeding in the proper direction of travel, and appear red on the reverse to warn drivers that they are proceeding against the proper direction of travel, creating a danger of a head-on collision. Reflective markers are also referred to as raised pavement markers, road studs, and sometimes (generically) in the UK and Ireland as cat's eye, although this name refers to one particular brand of product. These markers can be used for other purposes such as marking the locations of fire hydrants (blue) or at gates of gated communities to indicate that emergency service vehicles have a code or device that allows them to open the gate. In the United Kingdom and elsewhere, raised markers are used to mark pedestrian crossings to assist the blind in crossing streets. In colder climates, reflective markers may be installed below ground using an elongated narrow triangle, cut into the road surface that allows the device to be installed below the road surface. Newer technology allows these to be placed above ground with snowplough-able rails that attempt to protect the reflective components from the snowplow blade.

Confusion with marks left by roadwork

Sometimes the result of roadwork may leave visible marks on the pavements. An example is the dowel bar retrofit process to reinforce concrete slabs in order to extend the life of older concrete pavements. The completion of the process leaves a symmetrical pattern of dash marks on the roadway, as if there were an associated meaning to the pattern. When there are many of them along the roadway, motorists may interpret the marks as an unknown form of mechanical markers or strange road surface markings. When roads are under construction and the lanes are shifted laterally, those marks may interfere with temporary lane markings. As the marks from the dowel bar retrofit are not intended to be any form of road surface markings, the responsible agencies try to make these marks less visible to the motorists.

Non-mechanical markers

Marker types

Paint
Paint, sometimes with additives such as retroreflective glass beads, is generally used to mark travel lanes. It is also used to mark spaces in parking lots or special purpose spaces for disabled parking, loading zones, or time-restricted parking areas. colors for these applications vary by locality. Paint is a low-cost marking and has been in widespread use since approximately the early 1950s. 

Paint consists of three main components: pigments, resins or binders, and water or solvents. Pigments are finely grounded materials that give out colors or block out the surface beneath it. They may contain other materials such as UV stabilizer, and fillers which bring out the color pigments to the required level. Resins or binders are the glue of the paint to bind pigment and glass beads together to the road surface. The resins for water-based paints are polyvinyl acetate latex, methyl methacrylate or acrylic resin. The resins for solvent-based paints are linseed or soya oils and alkyd resins. The pigments and resins are mixed with water for water-based paints and solvents for solvent-based paints so that they can be applied onto the road surface. Solvents include naphtha, toluene, methanol, methylene chloride, and acetone. Due to environmental concerns, some jurisdictions may have restrictions on solvent-based paints.

Paint is usually applied right after the road has been paved. The road is marked commonly by a truck called a "striper." These trucks contain hundreds of gallons of paint stored in huge drums which sit on the bed. The markings are controlled manually or automatically by the controller who sits on the bed. Paint is run through a series of hoses under air pressure and applied to the roadway surface along with the application of glass beads for retroreflectivity. After application, the paint dries fairly quickly. Sometimes the glass beads are mixed in with the paint and applied together, which is not a recommended method. The usual method is to use a separate gun to spray the glass beads on to the wet paint during the application.

Painted symbols, such as turn-lane arrows or HOV lane markers, are applied manually using stencils. Painted markings usually last 9 to 36 months. There are some water-based paints that can be applied at double the level of thickness of typical latex paints. This technique can extend the life of the markings.

Stones

In roads paved with setts (as in Belgian/Italian or Portuguese styles) or cobblestones, markings can be made with white blocks or stones, like marble or other light-coloured rocks. This kind of marking is long-lasting, but can be slippery in rain or wet conditions unless surfaced with a matte or rough finish.

Thermoplastic

One of the most common types of road marking based on its balance between cost and performance longevity, thermoplastic binder systems are generally based on one of three core chemistries: hydrocarbons, rosin esters or maleic modified rosin esters (MMRE). Thermoplastic coatings are generally homogeneous dry mixes of binder resins, plasticizers, glass beads (or other optics), pigments, and fillers. Their use has increased over paints mainly due to the performance benefits of increased durability, retro-reflectivity, and a lack of VOC solvents.

Thermoplastic markings are applied using specially designed vehicles. Usually, thermoplastic marking mode is applied by machine to coat traffic lines, afree preheating by a device commonly called a preheater. The thermoplastic mix is heated in trucks to about ] before being fed to the application apparatus. This is often a screed box or ribbon gun. Immediately after the thermoplastic has been applied, glass beads are laid onto the hot material so that they embed before the plastic hardens. These beads provide initial retroreflection. As the marking wears during use and the initial beads are lost, the beads mixed with the binder are uncovered, providing long-term retroreflectivity. These can be made exceptionally thick to produce a rumble strip effect.

The thermoplastic marking coating sets quickly. The melt adhesion of a synthetic resin makes hot-melt paint adhere strongly to the road surface. Additives in the coating paint increases the coating plasticity, improving the anti-settling, anti-pollution, and anti-tarnish qualities. Thermoplastic marking paint is most commonly produced in yellow and white. The white marking paint mainly contains titanium white, zinc oxide, and lithopone, while the yellow paint is mainly heat-yellowing lead.

In warm climate areas, the thermoplastic markings can last three to six years. However, snowplows can damage the thermoplastics, limiting usage in cold-climate areas. The filling materials of road paint can affect the mechanical strength, abrasion resistance and hue of the coating film. The particle size of the paint powder influences the flow, sedimentation, and the surface processing.

Preformed thermoplastic

Preformed thermoplastic pavement markings (sometime called "tape", but not to be confused with preformed polymer tape) are thermoplastic cut into the final shapes by the manufacturers and ready to position onto an asphalt or concrete pavement surface. Preformed thermoplastics are put into place on the road surface and applied using a propane heat torch. Some models require heating the road surface prior to the placement of the preformed thermoplastics. These markings are used primarily because of their durability and cost-effective service life. Since the plastics are melted into the surface, they are not easily damaged by snowplows. Typically, the preformed thermoplastic markings can last 3 to 6 years. The most common applications of preformed thermoplastic pavement markings are found at intersections as transverse markings such as stop lines, legends, crosswalks, arrows, bike lane symbols, and accessibility symbols.

Preformed polymer tape

Commonly referred to as tape or cold plastic, this product is heavy-grade material with reflective beads embedded in the plastic. It is commonly used to mark crosswalks, stop bars, and traffic guidance such as turn lanes, HOV lanes, train crossings, pedestrian crossings, taxi lanes, bus lanes, and bike lanes. There are two ways to apply tape:

 Overlay: The application being laid over the surface of the pavement. Using industrial-grade rubber cement, once the tape is combined with the pavement, it should last three years. Major obstacles to estimated life are snowplows, salt, and misapplication.
 Inlay: The tape physically becomes part of the asphalt. Using the heat generated in the paving process, road workers lay special tape on the asphalt in the hardening process, and rollers compress the two together.

The life of the preformed polymer tapes can vary based on the applications. If applied correctly, they can last between 4 and 8 years. However, there have been cases where tape failures start soon after the installation. Conditions that may contribute to tape failure are cold weather at installation, surface preparation, and workmanship. A technique to minimize the tape being scraped off by snowplows is sandblasting a groove into the surface and fixing the tape onto this groove. This technique diminishes the advantage of low labor cost of the tapes.
The preformed polymer tape markings are slippery when wet, especially in large sections such as crosswalks, and caution should be used due to poor wet traction.

Epoxy
Epoxy consists of parts: a pigmented resin base and catalyst. The two parts are mixed in a specialized truck for epoxy marking application. The epoxy is then heated prior to spraying onto road surface. Retroreflective glass beads are applied using a separate bead gun behind the epoxy spray gun. Typically, epoxy markings last about 4 years.

Epoxy has been in use since the late 1970s and has gained popularity over the 1990s as the technology has become more affordable and reliable. This material competes directly with plastic with respect to usage and cost.

Glass beads 

Glass beads composed of soda lime glass are essential for providing retroreflectivity in many kinds of road markings. Retroreflectivity occurs when incident light from vehicles is refracted within glass beads that are imbedded in road markings and then reflected back into the driver's field of view.

To install glass beads, line painters often use hand dispensers or glass bead dispensers. No matter what tool they use, the line paint should be wet when applying the reflective glass. It is important that the reflective glass beads is not mixed with paint. They must sit on top of the paint to catch the light from the vehicles.

In the United States, the demand for glass beads has led to importing from countries using outdated manufacturing regulations and techniques. These techniques include the use of heavy metals such as arsenic, antimony, and lead during the manufacturing process as decolourizing and fining agents. It has been found that the heavy metals become incorporated into the bead's glass matrix and may leach under environmental conditions that roads experience.

Abrasion may dislodge these beads from the road marking itself, and the reaction of these beads with an aqueous environment vastly accelerates their decomposition and heavy metal release. During both routine road marking removal and harsh environmental conditions, these glass beads can degrade and leach incorporated heavy metals. There are other, non-toxic metals that can achieve the same results. These may include zirconium, tungsten, titanium, and barium.

Negative impacts to road surface

Non-mechanical markers are found to contribute to the deterioration of asphalt concrete road surface courses. The paint and tape markers can cause the road surface to crack, and in more severe cases, the markers contribute to road surface raveling (a process in which the aggregate particles are dislodged from the road surface, causing the surface texture to become deeply pitted and very rough) or potholes.

This type of surface damage can be found exclusively underneath the pavement markings such as lane markings and turn-lane arrows. There is no definitive explanation of the relationship between pavement markings and surface deterioration, but there are several hypotheses. One is that water vapor may have been trapped underneath the road surface markings, causing the de-bonding of asphalt binder from the aggregate materials. Another hypothesis is that the reflectivity of the markings may create differences in solar heating and thermal expansion strains between the areas with and without markings. Small flaws caused by differential strains may be combined into longitudinal cracks along the markings. There are certain surface treatments that can make the road surface less susceptible to this type of distresses, such as slurry seals and stone mastic asphalt.

Marker removal

There are several methods of maker removal:

Blasting: There are many materials that can be used for blasting on the road surface to remove markers. These include water, sand, crushed glass, dry ice and soda. High-pressure water blasting method uses  water jet system on a truck equipped with vacuum heads to blast out the markings and suction up the water and debris back to the storage area of the truck. The only disadvantage of this method is that it can only be operated at above the freezing temperature. Sand blasting methods utilizes high-pressure air and a nozzle to blast sand aggregate. This method produces a lot of debris. It requires a vehicle to supply the aggregate sand and another vehicle with debris collection system. Sand blasting can cause the pavement surface to be polished causing surface scares and ghost marks due to the contrast between the blasting and non blasting areas. Soda and dry ice blasting are similar to sand blasting with reduced effects in surface scarring and ghost marks, but it is slower. However, the method has been replaced with high-pressure water blasting. 
Grinding: The grinding method is to use rotating abrasive surface against the markings to break them up. It can be in the form of grinding, milling or flailing. One grinding head uses orbital abrasive disks similar to an orbital sander. Another grinding head uses spindles with teeth. Another type of grinding use a drum of disks with teeth stacked side by side. Surface scarring is expected with all grinding technics.
Burning: High heat and flame can be used as methods of marker removal. The flame is applied directly to the markers. In both methods, care is to be taken not to melt the asphalt road surface.
Other methods: Laser has been used in an experimental phase to remove markers, but the process is slow. A method of chemical applications to the markers to break them down is also used. This method requires pressure washing to remove the markers. In certain cases, masking the makers is preferred. Marking material is used to cover the markers or a portion of road surface. The color of the masking material is made to be similar to the color of the road surface. Some markings such removable preformed tapes are applied as a temporary marker removal measure. The most expensive method is resurfacing. This method is used only in limited cases.

Road marking technique
Thermoplastic road marking paint is a solid powder at room temperature. The thermoplastic paint is melted in a specialized machine called a thermoplastic heater-mixer, before being transferred into the paint tank of a marker.  Larger marking machines may have internal heater-mixers. The molten coating is introduced into an insulated marking bucket. The marking bucket leads to a marking shoe that applies the material.  Moving the shoe forward pulls a thin layer of paint onto the road.  The thickness of this layer is controlled by the gap between the marking shoe and the road.  A specialized attachment can spread an even layer of glass beads onto the paint as it is deposited.

Machine marking types 
Air spray  is a method of marking that uses compressed air to spray the paint onto the road surface. The finely atomized paint produces a thin and smooth layer, but the rebounding air flow causes significant paint scattering.  This produces somewhat sloppy markings.

High-pressure airless spraying uses a high-pressure airless pump to spray the paint. The atomized paint is not so fine and smooth as air spray, but there is no high speed air flow to scatter any rebounding paint. The marked lines are neat.  This method can apply paints of high viscosity, and apply relatively thick layers in a single pass.

Auxiliary equipment 
Other equipment is often used with road marking machines.  The main auxiliary equipment includes thermoplastic paint pre-heaters, hand-push pre-markers and road marking removers. Thermoplastic paint pre-heater is used to melt the solid powder coating into a viscous liquid, providing a steady supply of paint to the marking machine. Pre-markers are used to draw a field sketch in advance to avoid faulty marking. Road marking removers are used to remove old or incorrect markings. Large self-propelled machines usually do not need any support equipment, as equivalent functionality is built in.

Temporary markers
Traffic cones are sometimes used to separate High-occupancy vehicle lanes from regular traffic lanes. They are also used in areas where lanes are used at different times for travel in both directions. These cones have shafts that drop into holes in the road surface. A good example of this type of use was the Golden Gate Bridge in San Francisco, before they switched to a moveable barrier system.

Removable tapes can also be used in road construction sites as temporary markers. The tapes can be placed to shift the lanes and black tapes can be used to temporarily blackout the existing markings. At the end of the constructions or within 6 months, the tapes can be pulled out off the surface without using heat, solvents, or machines.

Country specific information

The Americas
Almost all countries in North and South America have solid and intermittent yellow lines separating traffic directions. However, Chile and Argentina have intermittent white lines separating traffic when overtaking is permitted from both directions, and solid yellow lines when overtaking is prohibited from both directions; when overtaking is permitted from only one direction, such countries separate traffic with a combination of white and yellow lines.

Canada
Yellow lines are used to separate traffic moving in opposite directions, and white lines are used to separate traffic moving in the same direction, and on the shoulders of paved roads. On one-directional roads, a yellow line appears on the left shoulder, and a white line on the right shoulder. Passing rules are denoted by dashed lines as in the United States. In Ontario, it is legal to cross a single or double solid yellow line along a straight road and the vehicle is not within 30 meters of a bridge or railway crossing.

Orange painted lines are sometimes used when the direction of the road is altered temporarily for construction projects. However, the color scheme was reversed before 1971, when white was formerly used to denote the separation of opposing traffic, and yellow lines, when used, to denote the separation of the paved road from the right-hand shoulder.

Broken lines that are wider and closer together than regular broken lines are called continuity lines. Continuity lines on the left side of a lane denote that the lane is about to end and that motorists must soon merge left. Continuity lines on the right mean that the lane will continue, but traffic may merge into it ahead.

In some areas, reflective markers (cat's eyes) recessed into the pavement are used, especially approaching curves in the road.

A number of provinces have pavement marking test areas on major roads, to evaluate new pavement markings in relation to existing markings.  In Ontario, a well-known location is the eastbound lanes of Highway 401 near Belleville. Other test sites are located on the westbound lanes on Highway 417, east of Ottawa, Highway 60 West of Renfrew, Highway 28 east of Bancroft, Highway 400 North of Honey Harbour and on Highway 37, South of Tweed. Pavement marking manufacturers from around the world supply a variety of materials for these sites to have their products evaluated and approved for use on provincial highways.  Other provinces with road marking test areas include Quebec, New Brunswick, and Nova Scotia.  Quebec's is outside of Montreal on Autoroute 40; in New Brunswick, the area is outside of Fredericton on Highway 2; Nova Scotia's test area is north of Halifax on Highway 102.

United States

In the United States, the first documented use of a painted center line was in 1911 along Trenton's River Road in Wayne County, Michigan. According to the state of Michigan, the idea of using a painted center line was conceived in 1911 by Edward N. Hines, the chairman of the Wayne County, Michigan, Board of Roads, after watching a leaky milk wagon leave a white trail along a road. Hines was the fifth recipient of the George S. Bartlett Award for Highway Progress, and was inducted posthumously in 1972 into the Michigan Transportation Hall of Honor for his innovation, and was honored in 2011 with the first Paul Mijksenaar Design for Function Award.

In 1917, the idea of using painted center lines on rural state highways was conceived and/or put into action in at least three states (Michigan, Oregon, and California), apparently completely independent of one another. At some point in 1917, a white highway center line was painted along "Dead Man's Curve" on what is now County Road 492 in Marquette County, Michigan, under the direction of Kenneth Ingalls Sawyer, who served as engineer-superintendent of the Marquette County Road Commission. Sawyer was inducted posthumously into the Michigan Transportation Hall of Honor in 1973.

In Oregon in April 1917, a yellow center line was painted down the center of the Columbia River Highway, between Crown Point and Multnomah Falls, at the direction of Multnomah County Sheriff's Deputy Peter Rexford. Later in 1917, the same line was continued west of Crown Point. Rexford first conceived the idea of a yellow center line in early 1917 while riding on a bus from Salem, Oregon on a dark and rainy night, and advocated it as a safety measure on the Columbia River Highway, which Rexford patrolled as a traffic officer. When Multnomah County declined to fund the project, Rexford's boss, Chief Deputy Martin T. Pratt (later elected Sheriff), paid for the paint out of his own pocket so that the center line could be painted. Rexford later described the April 1917 line as the "first yellow center line ever painted on pavement" in the United States. An article published in The Oregonian upon Rexford's retirement claimed that a contest with a $10,000 reward was once held to determine the originator of the highway center line, but the contest was scrapped when information from Europe revealed that ancient civilizations had used white bricks to mark the center lines of their streets.

In the fall of 1917, Dr. June McCarroll of Indio, California developed the idea of white center lines and began advocating for their use, after she was run off the road by a truck while driving along a highway that would later be incorporated into US 99. Dr. McCarroll soon communicated her idea to the local chamber of commerce and the Riverside County Board of Supervisors, with no success. She then took it upon herself to hand-paint a white stripe down the middle of the road, thus establishing the actual width of the lane to prevent similar accidents. In 2002, a portion of Interstate 10 was designated and signed as "The Doctor June McCarroll Memorial Freeway" in her honor.

The question of which color to use for highway center lines (dividing opposing traffic) in the United States was the subject of considerable debate and changing standards over a period of several decades.  It was the single most controversial and most heavily debated issue resolved by the promulgation of the 1948 edition of the Manual on Uniform Traffic Control Devices (MUTCD), which mandated white as the standard color of center lines nationwide.  The only exceptions to this standard were for double center lines on multi-lane highways and for center lines in no-passing zones, where yellow was recommended but not mandatory. By November 1954, 47 of the 48 states had adopted white as their standard color for highway centerlines, with Oregon being the last holdout to use yellow. In 1958, the U.S. Bureau of Public Roads adopted white as the standard color for the new interstate highway system.

The 1961 edition of the MUTCD mandated the use of yellow for the two specific exceptions where yellow had been previously recommended but not required, and concurrently banned white in those contexts. The drafters of the 1961 MUTCD gave three reasons for the change: "(1) It contrasts with the normal white center or lane lines and thus gives emphasis to the hazard; (2) Yellow has been accepted as a symbolic warning color in signs and signals; and (3) It is consistent with the standard for no-passing-zone markings approved by the American Association of State Highway Officials and is in use in more than two-thirds of the States for barrier lines."

The 1971 edition of the MUTCD mandated yellow as the standard color of all center lines on all roads and highways in all contexts, and banned the use of white. The point was to establish a consistent color code in pavement markings: from now on, yellow would always delineate opposing traffic flows and white would always delineate traffic flowing in the same direction. The changeover to the 1971 MUTCD standards took place between 1971 and 1975, with most repainting completed by the end of 1973, so for two years drivers still had to use the old and new. One odd exception was that white was still allowed as the left edge line color on the leftmost lane (closest to the median) on divided highways.  The 1973 supplement of the MUTCD fixed this by mandating yellow for left edge lines on divided highways.

The major downside to the MUTCD white-yellow system is that yellow has slightly less contrast than white, especially at night, so for maximum contrast, bright yellow—and highly toxic—lead chromate was used to paint yellow lines through the end of the 20th century. As a result, U.S. transportation workers must take special precautions when disturbing or removing yellow lane markings.

In 2002, the Texas A&M Transportation Institute researched the viability of converting from yellow to white center lines for the Transportation Research Board.  The researchers conducted a survey and discovered that 75% of American drivers associate dashed yellow center lines with dividing opposing traffic; this number rises to 85% for solid center lines.  These findings implied that any conversion to white would require an enormously expensive driver education program on top of the cost of repainting center lines, and therefore the Texas researchers advised against conversion.

In the U.S., the type, placement, and graphic standards of traffic signs, and road surfaces are legally regulated—the Federal Highway Administration's Manual on Uniform Traffic Control Devices is the standard, although each state produces its own manual based upon the Federal manual.

In some areas, such as Colorado and Florida, black material is applied on the surface before a shorter white line is painted. This improves the contrast of the marking against "white" pavements, such as concrete or faded asphalt.

In California, Botts' dots were commonly used to mark lanes on most freeways from the mid-1960s to the mid-2010s (when the state began to transition away from them and back to using painted lines to divide lanes). Many California cities also use Botts' dots on some (or all) major arterial roads. The notable exception is the city of Los Angeles which only uses paint.

In California and Nevada, Botts' dots when present are usually the lines, and no paint is used for additional markings. Exceptions include: freeways built from white concrete where painted stripes are added to make the lanes more visible through sun glare, freeways built so wide that the risk of drifting out of lane is minimal (e.g., Interstate 5 in the Central Valley), and freeways in areas where it snows in the winter (since the snowplows would scrape off the Botts' dots).

In general, white lines separate traffic in the same direction, single broken lines mean passing or lane changing is allowed, single solid white lines mean lane changing is discouraged or prohibited, and double solid white lines mean it is prohibited, as it often is in tunnels. On two-lane roads, a single broken center line means that passing is allowed in either direction, a double solid center line means passing is prohibited in both directions, and the combination of a solid line with a broken line means that passing is allowed only from the side with the broken line and prohibited from the side with the solid line.  Lanes with double broken yellow lines on each side are reversible, and lane control signals are used to indicate which direction traffic in such lanes is supposed to travel.  The solid white line on the right side is called the 'fog line' used to help cars stay in their lane during foggy conditions and help pedestrians stay off the road.

Marked crosswalks are indicated at a minimum by a pair of white lines. On major boulevards, crosswalks are further highlighted by zebra stripes, which are large white rectangles in the crosswalk perpendicular to traffic. In order to maximize the longevity of zebra crossing stripes, they are usually applied to correspond with the portions of the lane on which the wheels of a car are not usually traveling, thereby reducing wear on the markings themselves.

Pavement markings are used in addition to signs in the United States to designate regular and handicap parking spaces. Regular parking spaces are normally marked with white, although other colours are used. Handicap parking spaces are required to be located within a specified distance of an entrance. Blue markings are used to indicate the parking space is reserved for persons with a disabled parking permit.

Text is painted onto the pavement to reinforce roadside signs that may be obscured for various reasons or that drivers may overlook. Common examples of such legends include "STOP" (before a solid stop line and beside a stop sign) and "SCHOOL" (at the beginning of a school zone). On many California streets, the speed limit is painted onto the road surface to alert drivers to a reduced speed zone. At some complex junctions, route shield pavement markings guide drivers into the correct lane in advance of an overhead guide sign.

Pavement marking test areas exist throughout the United States on various major roads. In Florida, Interstate 95 has two test locations located in Brevard County: northbound lanes, between mile markers 194 to 198, where the roadway is concrete; and southbound lanes between mile markers 162 to 163, where the roadway is asphalt. Interstate 4 had two testing locations in Polk County between mile markers 27 to 29 in both east- and westbound lanes.

Asia

Hong Kong
Road markings in Hong Kong are basically identical with the United Kingdom, with longer dashed white lines to indicate lanes of opposing traffic, and shorter dashed white lines for lanes in the same direction. Solid double white lines are used to indicate that drivers are not permitted to change lanes. A solid white line with a broken white line indicates that crossing the line is allowed from the lane closer to the broken line. Double solid white lines are in place in all tunnels and underpasses.

As in the UK, solid yellow lines are painted along the kerbside to indicate that no parking is allowed, with double solid yellow lines meaning no parking is allowed at any time.  But unlike the UK loading and unloading are also prohibited in addition to parking. (Parking itself is prohibited on any street with lamp posts with or without the yellow markings on kerbside.) Zig-zag lines are used on both ends of zebra crossings. Road studs are also used as in the UK.

Israel 
In Israel, white lines are used to separate both traffic driving in the same direction and in opposite directions, while yellow lines are used to mark the shoulder of the road.

Japan

In Japan, white always separates traffic in the same direction or indicates traffic in the same direction can use a buffered area that is striped in crosshatch patterns such as at right turns on two-way roads since Japan is a country that has left-side driving.

White is also used on divided expressways with a solid raised center divider. Two-lane expressways where poles are the only physical barrier between opposing directions of travel always have yellow either side of the row of poles, and white is between the yellow striping and the poles.

White is also used to denote passing allowed on other two-lane roads. Yellow indicates no passing is allowed. On all roads, yellow stripes are always solid.

On expressways where there are many sharp turns and curves, seen especially in the largest cities, a yellow line indicates no passing between lanes, as follows:

 Solid yellow beside solid white: no entry permitted from the lane the stripe is next to, but passing is permitted with caution.
 Solid yellow beside broken white: passing is permitted from the side with the broken white line, but not from the side with the yellow line.
 Solid yellow line alone: passing prohibited from either lane, used on very tight curves and in tunnels.

Other markings include in the cities, destination and exit names painted in the lanes, which is done due to the very close proximity of exits, where in many cases it would be impractical to put up many overhead signs, although these are often seen approaching exits, a curved or slanted arrow points to the side of the expressway the exit will be on. A straight arrow following characters indicates the destination of the expressway.

Where a solid white line appears between lanes, passing is generally allowed but with caution.

North Korea
Road markings in the Democratic People's Republic of Korea are rare, but if they do exist, the lines are usually painted white, as in the highway from Pyongyang to Nampo.

South Korea
In the Republic of Korea, white always separates traffic in the same direction. Solid line means "do not change lanes", and a double solid line has the meaning of further emphasis on that way. Dash lines allow changing lanes. Zigzag lanes mean deceleration.

The yellow line is the center line, which separates traffic in the opposite direction. Solid line means "do not overtake", and double solid line has the meaning of further emphasis on that way. Dash lines allow overtaking. Some intersections have white broken lines at the center. This means it's a U-turn area; drivers can make U-turns only at this place and not make a U-turn over the yellow line.

A blue line means bus (or tram) only.
 Single line: bus-only lane at a rush hour such as 7:00-9:00 / 17:30-19:30 on weekdays
 Double line: bus-only lane at additional times such as 5:00-11:00 / 15:00-22:00 on weekdays or double line on several streets means bus-only lane all day, including weekends.
 Dash line: bus-only lane. Other cars can temporarily use bus lanes to turn right into alleys or join regular lanes. Taxis can also temporarily pass through bus-only lanes to allow passengers to get on and off.
 Solid line: bus-only lane. Other cars are never allowed to enter the bus-only lane.

A line drawn along the side of the road:
 White line: parking and stopping is allowed, but it isn't allowed on motorways and expressways.
 Yellow dash line: stopping is allowed, but no parking. However, some local governments allow parking at particular times. The time available for parking is written on a sign.
 Yellow single solid line: no parking and no stopping, however some local governments allow parking or stopping at particular times. The time available for parking or stopping is written on a sign.
 Yellow double solid line: no parking and stopping all day. These are used near an intersection, the crosswalk, or a bus station.
 Red double solid line: no parking or stopping all day because there is a fire hydrant.
 Zigzag lanes mean deceleration.

Indonesia
Road markings in Indonesia are almost similar to markings in Europe and especially in the Netherlands.

Markings are divided into four types, they are:
Line marking, marks that are parallel to the axis of the road.
Cross marking, mark that is crosswise to the axis of the road, such as at a stop line at a Zebra cross or at an intersection
Chevron, sign that forms a complete line which is not included in the meaning of line marking or cross marking, to indicate an area of the road surface that is not a vehicle traffic lane.
Symbol marking, mark that contain certain meanings to express warnings, orders and prohibitions to complement or confirm the intent conveyed by traffic signs or other traffic signs.

The colors also represent the use, they are:
White for line
Yellow for line (National road)
Red for Bus-way and School zone
Green for Bicycle

Europe

In general European countries follow the Vienna Convention on Road Signs and Signals, which describes what road signs and road markings shall look like. The convention has some flexibility so road markings vary somewhat between the countries.

Most European countries reserve white for routine lane markings of any kind. Yellow is used to mark forbidden parking, such as on bus stops. In most European countries, white is used to separate traffic directions, but this is not the case in Norway: the country instead has yellow markings separating traffic directions. Many countries use yellow, orange, or red to indicate when lanes are being shifted temporarily to make room for construction projects. In Croatia, in addition to serving as temporary signage, yellow lines are used permanently to distinguish lanes and turn directions dedicated to public transport.

In France on highways the outside lines are interrupted at a regular distance which allows drivers and police to check distance between moving vehicles.

In the Netherlands, Germany, Sweden, and the UK, so-called "naked roads" have been trialed, whereby all visible road markings, kerbs, traffic lights, and signs are removed, on urban roads. When this was tested in Seend, a village in the UK county of Wiltshire in 2005, the county council reported that accidents fell by a third, with motorists' speed falling by an average of 5%. It has been suggested that naked roads force drivers to make eye contact with other road users, and that it is this nonverbal communication that is responsible for the reduction of accidents. Others have suggested that road markings, especially with middle marker, make the road look like a main road, triggering faster and more relaxed driving, while no marking makes the road look like a lower quality road. It is an experience from the introduction of marking, that at least on narrow roads and in curves, middle lines help make drivers stay on their side when meeting, and therefore reducing meeting accidents. Note that the 2005 experiment was on urban roads. In Sweden, local streets generally have no marking.

Netherlands
In the Netherlands all general lines are white, while yellow lines are used to mark forbidden stopping (solid yellow), forbidden parking (broken yellow) and for temporarily lining at construction projects.

Shoulder lines are generally interrupted outside built-up area to make the driver be aware the presence of crossing bicycles and pedestrians, driveways and stopping cars. Wider roads sometimes have a single, but in most cases have a double centre line. Interrupted center lines mean overtaking is allowed, a solid line means overtaking is not allowed, depending on which side of a double line is solid. Smaller roads and roads where bicycles are allowed generally do not have center lines, and many country roads have no lines at all. Sometimes there is a center line only in sharp curves.

Shoulder lines on expressways and motorways are solid to imply the general absence of crossing traffic and residential driveways, as well as the disallowance of leaving the road on places other than specified exits. Expressways always have double centre lines. Exit and acceleration lanes are separated by 'block marking'.

Furthermore, several traffic signs are painted on the road, such as speed limits and warning signs.

Norway
In Norway, yellow lines are used to separate traffic moving in opposite directions and on the left shoulders of paved roads, and white lines are used to separate traffic moving in the same direction, and on the right shoulders of paved roads. Short, broken lines means passing is allowed, long, broken lines means passing is allowed but dangerous, and a double yellow line means passing is forbidden. Roads with speed limits below  that indicate that passing is allowed but dangerous have a very short yellow line instead of a long one. On motorways, the left shoulder is a yellow line, like in the US. Most other European countries use white lines for all these types of lines.

United Kingdom

In the UK, the first "white line" road markings appeared on a number of dangerous bends on the London-Folkestone road at Ashford, Kent, in 1914.

In England, the idea of painting a center white line was first experimented with in 1921 in Sutton Coldfield, Birmingham. Following complaints by residents over reckless driving and several collisions, the Sutton Coldfield Corporation decided to paint the line on Maney Corner in the area of Maney.

In 1971, a correspondent for the Sutton Coldfield News wrote an article in the newspaper recalling the event.

During World War II the Pedestrians Association lobbied for the government to make it safer for pedestrians to walk during the black out. As a result, white lines were painted on the sides of the road and pedestrians were allowed to use a small torch.

Following the successful "white line" experiment at Ashford, Kent in 1914, the use of painted lines on UK roads grew dramatically during the 1920s. In 1926 official guidelines were issued by the Ministry of Transport that defined where and how white lines on roads should be used. A broken white line in the direction of travel, where the gaps are longer than the painted lines, indicates the center of the road and that there are no hazards specific to the design and layout of the road, i.e. no turnings, sharp bends ahead etc. A broken white line in which the gaps are shorter than the painted lines indicates an upcoming hazard.

The Ministry of Transport experimented with double-line road markings for the first time on sections of the A20 and A3 during Easter in 1957. The markings were cautionary, and had no legal status at that time, but motorists were advised that ignoring them could weigh heavily against someone involved in an accident in their vicinity. Further, "it is in order, if safe to do so, to cross the lines only when the broken one is on your side. It is not in order to cross when the solid line is on your side or to park there." Despite the instruction about parking, it was observed that nine bus stops were located inside prohibited parking areas.

A double solid white line indicates that the line may not be crossed, overtaking is permitted if it can be performed safely without crossing the line. Solid lines can be crossed in certain specific conditions (entering premises, overtaking a stationary vehicle, overtaking a vehicle, pedal cycle or horse travelling at less than 10 mph, or when directed to do so by a police officer). A solid white line with a broken white line parallel to it indicates that crossing the line is allowed for traffic in one direction (the side closest to the broken line) and not the other.

Solid white lines are also used to mark the outer edges of a road.

A double yellow line (commonly known as just a "Double Yellow") next to the curb means that no parking is allowed at any time, whilst a single yellow line is used in conjunction with signs to denote that parking is restricted at certain times. Double and single red lines mean that stopping is not allowed at any time or between certain times respectively.

On many roads in the UK, retro-reflective road studs, including those known as "cat's eyes" when referring to the Halifax type road stud, are placed in the road. These devices reflect the light from a car's headlights back towards the driver in order to highlight features of the road in poor visibility or at night. The color of road studs differs according to their location. Those defining the division between lanes are white, red road studs are placed along the hard shoulder of motorways, dual carriageways and other roads to mark the left-hand edge of a running lane; and orange road studs are placed along the edge of the central reservation. Green road studs denote slip roads at grade-separated junctions and also road-side lay-bys.

Comprehensive information about highway markings in the UK can be found in the Highway Code and on the gov.uk website.

Russia
In Russia, yellow lines may be used instead of white lines to separate oncoming traffic flows. They were authorized only recently, in 2018, and were first painted on a short stretch of federal highway A138 in Murmansk Oblast. Broken yellow lines at the edge of the road mean that you cannot park, but can stop for up to 5 minutes, or more if that is needed to load and unload people or cargo. A solid yellow line on the edge of the road denotes that stopping is prohibited.

During road works, temporary orange lines are often provided. These have priority over permanent markings.

Oceania

Australia 
In Australia, road markings are typically in line with Germany and Switzerland. White lines are generally used both to separate traffic flowing in the same direction and traffic flowing in opposite directions. Double solid white centre lines may not be crossed under any circumstances unless avoiding an obstruction except in New South Wales and Western Australia where double lines may be crossed to enter or leave the roadway. Dashed lines may be crossed for overtaking, changing lanes or turning, and also in the case of double-line markings provided the dashed line is on your side of the markings. For this reason, dashed lines are usually used to mark multiple lanes travelling in one direction. Single yellow lines along road edges are used nationally to indicate "No Standing" areas not otherwise marked by signs. Solid white lines are also used to indicate kerbside parking, pedestrian and bicycle lanes, and other kerbside features. In cities with tramway networks, double yellow lines separate the tramway from the road. Yellow line markings are also used in areas that receive regular annual snowfall to provide contrast. Double-line markings are used to separate traffic flowing in opposite directions on busy roads.

Solid white lines are used to mark an intersection that a driver must stop at before entering whilst obeying all right-of-way laws. Dashed white lines are used to mark an intersection at which a driver must give way. Dashed white lines are also commonly used to indicate turns in intersections and to indicate intersections where a diamond turn is possible (intersections in which two cars travelling in opposite directions turn to the same direction of travel as each other without coming into contact).

Materials used are waterborne paint, thermoplastics, and cold-applied plastic (PMMA), all with glass beads. Bead is generally 1mm for longitudinal marking. Currently moving to performance-specified contracts with the primary performance indicator being retro-reflectivity measured with  geometry instruments. Intervention levels vary generally from 100 to 150 mcd/lux/m2 (from 0.029 to 0.044 foot-lamberts).

New Zealand
Although New Zealand follows the convention of a solid yellow line to indicate no passing on roads with two-way traffic, it uses  dashed white lines with a  gap to indicate when passing against opposing traffic is allowed on two-lane roads and shorter ones to separate lanes going in the same direction. The New Zealand convention followed the USA MUTCD convention common between 1961 and the early 1970s.

New Zealand road markings are governed/standardized by Part 2 of the Manual Of Traffic Signs And Markings (MOTSAM)

See also

 Paint (road marking paint)
 Pedestrian crossing
 Thermoplastic road marking paint
 Traffic lane
 Yellow line (road marking)
 Zebra crossing

References

External links

 U.S. Federal Highway Administration—Learn About Pavement Markings

Road surface markings
Traffic signs